Henryk Bista (12 March 1934 – 8 October 1997) was a Polish actor. He appeared in over 110 films between 1961 and 1997. He starred in the 1977 film Death of a President, which was entered into the 28th Berlin International Film Festival, where it won the Silver Bear for an outstanding artistic contribution. He was awarded many Polish film and state awards, including the Knight's Cross of the Order of Polonia Restituta (1984), the Gold and Silver Crosses of Merit (1976 and 1971, respectively) and the Bronze Medal of Merit for National Defence (1968).

Selected filmography

 Rzeczywistość (1961) - Roman Andrzejewski
 Banda (1965)
 Pieczone gołąbki (1966) - Worker (uncredited)
 Ostatni po Bogu (1968) - Józek
 Seksolatki (1972)
 Drzwi w murze (1974) - (uncredited)
 Czerwone i białe (1975) - Karol Krauze
 To Save the City (1976) - Capt. AK 'Sztych'
 Dagny (1977) - Antoni Przybyszewski - brother
 Ptaki, ptakom... (1977) - Karol Profaska
 Death of a President (1977) - Priest Nowakowski
 Pasja (1978) - Stranger
 Do krwi ostatniej... (1978) - Priest Franciszek Kubsz
 Wsród nocnej ciszy (1978) - Stefan Waniek
 80 huszár (1978)
 Szpital przemienienia (1979) - Dr. Kauters
 Sto koni do stu brzegów (1979)
 Sekret Enigmy (1979) - Brochwitz
 Hotel Klasy Lux (1979) - Henryk Jakubik
 Zielone lata (1980)
 Wizja lokalna 1901 (1980) - Head Teacher Fedtke
 Vabank (1981) - Jan Rozek
 The Turning Point (1983) - Polnischer Gefangener (uncredited)
 Oko proroka (1984)
 Synteza (1984) - Asteria
 Rok spokojnego slonca (1984) - (uncredited)
 Nie bylo slonca tej wiosny (1984) - Mazurek
 Kartka z podróży (1984) - Rabbi
 O-Bi, O-Ba: The End of Civilization (1985) - Chubby
 Przeklęte oko proroka (1985)
 Yesterday (1985) - Dyrector
 Przemytnicy (1985) - Old Alinczuk
 Medium (1985) - Dr. Mincel
 Podróze pana Kleksa (1986) - Wielki Elektronik
 Mokry szmal (1986) - Lason
 W cieniu nienawisci (1986)
 Ga, Ga - Chwala bohaterom (1986) - Preacher
 Sceny dziecięce z życia prowincji (1986) - Mr. M.
 Tanie pieniądze (1986) - Leon Solski 'Czeresniak'
 The Mother of Kings (1987) - Grzegorz Wiechra
 Komediantka (1987) - Doctor
 Życie wewnętrzne (1987) - Neighbour Tenodpsa
 Wierna rzeka (1987) - Dr. Kulewski
 Między ustami a brzegiem pucharu (1987) - Franz
 Łuk Erosa (1987) - Ramke
 Magnat (1987) - Gosche, Goebbels's Assistant
 Śmierć Johna L. (1988) - Kosinski
 Koniec sezonu na lody (1988) - Drabik
 On the Silver Globe (1988)
 Sonata marymoncka (1988) - Rustecki
 Schodami w górę, schodami w dół (1988) - Szmurlo
 Curse of Snakes Valley (1988) - Reporter
 Nowy Jork, czwarta rano (1988) - Traveller Seeking Miracles
 Kocham kino (1988) - Wacek Wislicki
 Pan Kleks w kosmosie (1988) - Wielki elektronik
 Meskie sprawy (1989)
 Pilkarski poker (1989) - Referee Jaskóla
 Decalogue X (1989, TV Mini-Series) - Shopkeeper
 A Tale of Adam Mickiewicz's 'Forefathers' Eve' (1989) - Senator
 Konsul (1989) - Company Manager Marian Lugowski
 Żelazną ręką (1989) - Cabas
 Ostatni dzwonek (1989) - School Director Wronacki
 Stan wewnetrzny (1989)
 Porno (1990) - Doctor
 Bal na dworcu w Koluszkach (1990) - Pszoniak - journalist
 Pożegnanie jesieni (1990) - Belzebub Bertz
 Historia niemoralna (1990) - Jurek
 Escape from the 'Liberty' Cinema (1990) - Janik
 Powrót wilczycy (1990) - Dr. Nussbaum
 W środku Europy (1990) - Bazarewicz
 Eminent Domain (1990)
 Smierc dziecioroba (1991) - Father of Blada
 Kanalia (1991) - Barber
 30 Door Key (1991)
 Dziecko szczęścia (1991) - Lawyer
  (1991) - Farmer
 Odjazd (1992) - Von Litzki
  (1992) - Kowalik
 Kuka on Joe Louis? (1992) - Vaimoaan muisteleva mies baarissa
 Biale malzenstwo (1992)
 Verykokka sto kalathi (1992)
 Cynga (1992)
 The Little Apocalypse (1993) - Yanek
 Pora na czarownice (1993) - Jozef
 Schindler's List (1993) - Mr. Löwenstein
 Dwa księżyce (1993) - Mistig
 Reverted (1994, TV Movie) - Director Biernacki
 Zivot a neobycejna dobrodruzstvi vojaka Ivana Conkina (1994) - Zhikin
 Polska śmierć (1994) - Osso's Neighbour
 Prowokato (1995)
 Les Milles (1995) - Otto von Offenberg
 Nothing Funny (1995) - Pyrotechnist
 Mlode wilki (1995)
 Akwarium (1996)
 Taranthriller (1997) - Ojciec
 Sztos (1997)
 Kochaj i rób co chcesz (1998) - Professor Wilczewski
 Ubu król (2003)

References

External links
 

1934 births
1997 deaths
Polish male film actors
People from Ruda Śląska
Deaths from cancer in Poland
Knights of the Order of Polonia Restituta
Recipients of the Gold Cross of Merit (Poland)
20th-century Polish male actors
Recipient of the Meritorious Activist of Culture badge